Alexion (died 44 BCE) was an ancient physician.  His name and profession are known from a lamentation on his sudden death, authored by his close friend Cicero. His name suggests that he was Greek.

References

 

44 BC deaths
1st-century BC Greek physicians
Year of birth unknown